Make Mine a Million is a 1959 British comedy film directed by Lance Comfort, starring Arthur Askey, Sid James, and Bernard Cribbins. The film parodies the stuffiness of the 1950s BBC and the effect of television advertising in the era.

It was shot at Shepperton Studios near London with sets designed by the art director Denis Wreford. The film was distributed by British Lion.

Plot
Arthur Ashton (in a parody of himself, Arthur Askey) is a makeup man working for National Television (a parody of the BBC). During a visit to the local launderette, he meets Sid Gibson (Sid James), a shady pedlar who is trying to flog Bonko, a brand of washing powder in the shape of a pill. The man cannot afford to advertise on TV, but wishes to do so. The fairly clueless Arthur agrees to help him, and they manage to plug an advert for Bonko on National Television by interrupting the live feed.

This causes quite a stir amongst the national television heads, who have Arthur fired. However, the advert proves extremely popular and demand for the product soars.

After repeating the stunt at Ascot Races, Sid, realising that this is potentially a huge moneymaker, does a deal with an advertising executive and, with Arthur's help, they plug cake mix at the Edinburgh Tattoo. Next Arthur materialises on stage during a production of Swan Lake.

After a narrow escape, Arthur wants to quit, but Sid persuades him to do one final job—interrupting a press conference between the British Prime Minister and the American President. On the way, the Post Office van they are using is hijacked by criminals. Arthur, who is in the back of the van, contacts the police using his broadcast system, to thwart the robbery, leading to the final barnyard showdown. In the end, Arthur, now a hero and celebrity, gets his own TV show, brokered by Sid, of course.

Cast

 Arthur Askey as Arthur Ashton
 Sid James as Sid Gibson
 Dermot Walsh as Martin Russell
 Olga Lindo as Mrs. Burgess
 Clive Morton as Director General
 Sally Barnes as Sally
 George Margo as Assistant
 Lionel Murton as Commercial TV director
 Bernard Cribbins as Jack
 Kenneth Connor as Anxious Husband
 Barbara Windsor as Switchboard Operator
 Martin Benson as Chairman
 David Nettheim as Professor
 Bruce Seton as Superintendent James
 Tommy Trinder as himself, Cameo appearance 
 Dickie Henderson as himself, Cameo appearance 
 Evelyn Laye as herself, Cameo appearance 
 Dennis Lotis as himself, Cameo appearance 
 Anthea Askey as herself, Cameo appearance 
 Raymond Glendenning as himself, Cameo appearance 
 Patricia Bredin as herself, Cameo appearance 
 Leonard Weir as himself, Cameo appearance 
 Sabrina as herself, Cameo appearance 
 Gillian Lynne as herself, Cameo appearance 
 Peter Noble as himself, Cameo appearance as TV Host 
 Prince Monolulu as himself, Cameo appearance 
 Leigh Madison as Diana 
 Sam Kydd as Mail Van Robber  
 Edwin Richfield as Plainclothes Policeman 
 Bill Shine as Outside Broadcast Producer
 Gordon Jackson as  non-speaking role as leader of the pipe band

Production
It was known during filming as Look Before You Laugh. Filming began 7 July 1958.

Reception
The Radio Times Guide to Films gives the film three stars out of five, describing it as a "pacey romp".

References

Bibliography
 McFarlane, Brian. Lance Comfort. Manchester University Press, 2019.

External links

1959 films
Films directed by Lance Comfort
1959 comedy films
British comedy films
Films set in London
Films with screenplays by Talbot Rothwell
Films about television
British Lion Films films
Films shot at Shepperton Studios
1950s English-language films
1950s British films